Fulgensia is a genus of lichenized fungi in the family Teloschistaceae.

Gallery

References

External links
Index Fungorum

Teloschistales
Lichen genera
Teloschistales genera
Taxa named by Abramo Bartolommeo Massalongo
Taxa named by Giuseppe De Notaris